Parliamentary elections were held in Benin on 30 March 2003. The result was a victory for the parties of the pro-government Presidential Movement supporting President Mathieu Kérékou, which won 52 of the 83 seats.

Results

References

Elections in Benin
Benin
Election
National Assembly (Benin)
Election and referendum articles with incomplete results